Alok Kumar is a member of the 14th, 15th and Sixteenth Legislative Assembly of Uttar Pradesh in India. He represents the Bhongaon constituency of Uttar Pradesh and is a member of the Samajwadi Party political party.

Early life and  education
Alok Kumar was born in Mainpuri district. He attended the Chaudhary Charan Singh University and attained Bachelor of Arts degree.

Political  career
Alok Kumar has been a MLA for three terms. He represented the Bhongaon constituency and is a member of the Samajwadi Party political party.
Alok Kumar is the only leader who holds the record of consecutive  three time MLA from constituency  Bhongaon since the Independence. In 2012 U. P. General Elections Alok Kumar won the Bhongaon seat by the margin of over 50,000 votes from his competitor Sakshi Maharaj, prominent and strong leader of Bharatiya Janta Party. 
He also held the position of State Minister of Technical Education in Uttar Pradesh Government during his third tenure as MLA.
The main cause of losing his seat in 2017 is the division of votes in his constituency due to family feud in Yadav Parivaar.
He lost his seat in the 2017 Uttar Pradesh Assembly election to Ram Naresh Agnihotri of the Bharatiya Janata Party.

Posts held

See also

 Bhongaon (Assembly constituency)
 Sixteenth Legislative Assembly of Uttar Pradesh
 Uttar Pradesh Legislative Assembly

References 

1972 births
Living people
People from Mainpuri district
Samajwadi Party politicians
Uttar Pradesh MLAs 2002–2007
Uttar Pradesh MLAs 2007–2012
Uttar Pradesh MLAs 2012–2017